Vince Herman is a guitarist and singer-songwriter best known for being one of the founding members of Leftover Salmon. Leftover Salmon started in 1989 as somewhat of a melding of the Left Hand String Band and the Salmonheads, and became more and more popular over the sixteen years that followed. The band decided to go their separate ways in 2005, but still play together (billed as Leftover Salmon) on occasion. Since the hiatus, Herman formed a new band named Great American Taxi, who released their debut album in 2007. GAT toured extensively and garnered a following, with hijinks such as joining Peter Rowan on stage and playing a Ficus tree for Moonalice. Vince toured with GAT until the Leftover Salmon tours called Vince away in 2013. 

Vince resides in Nashville, Tennessee and continues to tour with Leftover Salmon, as of 2021.

Discography

Leftover Salmon

Great American Taxi

External links
 Vince Herman Official Website
 Leftover Salmon Official Website
 Great American Taxi Official Website

American bluegrass musicians
Musicians from Colorado
Year of birth missing (living people)
Living people
Place of birth missing (living people)
Leftover Salmon members